8-track or eight-track may refer to:

 8-track tape, an analog magnetic tape format used for consumer audio distribution from the late 1960s to the early 1980s; also called 8-track cartridge
 8-track, an eight-track reel-to-reel magnetic tape format used for multitrack recording in professional recording studios
 8tracks, an online site for user-generated mixtapes

See also
 8-Track Flashback, an American television series broadcast on the VH1 network
 ADAT, a magnetic tape format used for the simultaneous digital recording of eight analogue audio or digital audio tracks
 Quadruple track, a railway line consisting of four parallel tracks